The 2022 Valletta Cup was a Twenty20 International (T20I) cricket tournament held in Malta between 10 and 15 May 2022. It was the third edition of the Valletta Cup. The venue for the series was the Marsa Sports Club in Marsa. The participating teams were the hosts Malta along with Bulgaria, Czech Republic, Gibraltar, Hungary and Romania. Malta were the defending champions having defeated Switzerland in the final of the 2021 edition. Bulgaria and Gibraltar returned after finishing the 2021 tournament in third and fourth places, respectively. The Czech Republic and Hungary last featured in the 2019 Valletta Cup, in which the Czechs beat a Hungary XI in the final.

In a round-robin game against Bulgaria, Gibraltar put on an unbeaten 213 runs for the first wicket, the fourth highest opening partnerships in T20Is. Malta secured a place in the final on day three with a game to spare, after winning their first four matches. Romania reached the final after a rapid run-chase against Gibraltar, and they went on to defeat the hosts by 9 runs in the final.

Squads

The Czech Republic also named Kranthi Venkataswamy and Neeraj Tyagi as reserves.

Round-robin

Points table

  Advanced to the final
  Advanced to the third-place play-off
  Advanced to the fifth-place play-off

Fixtures

Fifth-place play-off

Third-place play-off

Final

References

External links
 Series home at ESPNCricinfo

Associate international cricket competitions in 2022
Valletta Cup
Valletta Cup